Boutilimit Airport  is an airport serving the town of Boutilimit in Mauritania.

In 2015, construction was started on an approximately  paved runway to replace the old sand runway that was being encroached upon by the town.

See also
Transport in Mauritania

References

 OurAirports - Mauritania
 Great Circle Mapper - Boutilimit
 Boutilimit
 Google Earth

Airports in Mauritania